Alfalfa Center is an unincorporated community in Mississippi County, in the U.S. state of Missouri.

Alfalfa Center was laid out in 1935, and named for a local alfalfa processing factory.

References

Unincorporated communities in Mississippi County, Missouri
Unincorporated communities in Missouri